List of presidents by age may refer to:

Age at inauguration
List of presidents of Latvia by age
List of Nigerian presidents by age
List of South African presidents by age
List of presidents of the United States by age

Longevity